Sandemania is a monotypic genus of flowering plants belonging to the family Melastomataceae. The only known species is Sandemania hoehnei.

Its native range is southern Tropical America. It is found in Bolivia, Brazil (northern and west-central), Peru and Venezuela.

The genus name of Sandemania is in honour of Christopher Albert Walter Sandeman (1882–1951), an English botanist and traveler. He collected in South America. The Latin specific epithet of hoehnei refers to Frederico Carlos Hoehne (1882–1959), a Brazilian botanist. The genus was first described and published in Bull. Misc. Inform. Kew 1939, onpage 480 in 1939. The species was then first published in Phytologia Vol.20 on page 370 in 1970.

References

Melastomataceae
Melastomataceae genera
Monotypic Malvales genera
Plants described in 1939
Flora of Bolivia
Flora of Peru
Flora of Venezuela
Flora of North Brazil
Flora of West-Central Brazil
Taxa named by Alfred Cogniaux